The 2012 Three National Figure Skating Championships included the Czech Republic, Slovakia, and Poland. The event was hosted by the Czech association in Ostrava on December 16–17, 2011. Medals were awarded in the disciplines of men's singles, ladies' singles, pair skating, and ice dancing on the senior level. Some junior and novice-level events were also held.

The results were split by country; the three highest-placing skaters from each country in each discipline formed their national podiums. The results were among the criteria used to determine international assignments. It was the fourth consecutive season that the three countries held their national championships jointly.

Medals summary

Czech Republic

Slovakia

Poland

Senior results

Men

Ladies

Pairs

Ice dancing

Junior results

Pairs
No short program.

Ice dancing

References

External links
 2012 Three National Championships results
 Junior results: Czech (PDF), Polish, Slovak

Three Nationals Figure Skating Championships, 2012
Czech Figure Skating Championships
Slovak Figure Skating Championships
Polish Figure Skating Championships
2011 in Czech sport
2011 in Slovak sport
2011 in Polish sport
Czech Republic–Slovakia relations